Alexander Clerke (17 March 1804 – 20 March 1877) was an Irish politician in Tasmania, who was a member of the electoral division of Longford from 1853 to 1856.

Life 
Clerke grew up in a middle class family in Skibbereen. He trained as an engineer while his brother, Thomas, became a lawyer and moved to New York, United States. In 1853, he became the member of the Tasmanian Legislative Council in Longford, and stayed in that position for three years. He died on 20 March 1877, three days after his 73rd birthday, in Tasmania.

References 

1804 births
1877 deaths
19th-century Australian politicians
Members of the Tasmanian Legislative Council
Members of the Tasmanian House of Assembly